Niani Natung (May 15, 1968 – August 31, 2013) was an Indian politician from the Indian National Congress. She served as an MLA and Cabinet Minister, handling the portfolio of  Social welfare, Women and Child Development. She was the wife of  Dera Natung.

Political career 
After her husband, Dera Natung's death in a helicopter crash in May 2001, she was elected as an MLA, winning the by-election of the Pakke-Kessang Assembly constituency in East Kameng district, which was conducted on September 20, 2001. She was appointed Minister of State for Social welfare, Women and Child development. She was the first lady minister from the Nyishi community. Niani served as Chairperson of the Arunachal Pradesh State Social Welfare Board. She also held the position of vice president of Arunachal Pradesh Mahila Congress Committee.

Death 
On August 31, 2013, she died after a brief illness. Two sons and two daughters survive her. Her last rites were performed with full state honour.

References 

Indian National Congress politicians
People from  East Kameng district
1968 births
2013 deaths
State cabinet ministers of Arunachal Pradesh
Members of the Arunachal Pradesh Legislative Assembly